Abandoned Luncheonette, released in 1973, is the second album by the American pop rock duo Daryl Hall & John Oates. It combines folk, Philly soul, and acoustic soul. It is the most commercially successful of their Atlantic Records period; the album reached #33 on the Billboard Top LPs & Tapes chart and featured one of their first major hits, "She's Gone", which found success after a 1976 reissue. Twenty-nine years after its release, the album was certified platinum (over one million copies sold) by the Recording Industry Association of America.

Background
After their first album, Whole Oats, failed to make an impact, the duo moved from Philadelphia to New York and started recording Abandoned Luncheonette, which became the first album they recorded as New Yorkers. Their producer was still Arif Mardin, but they wanted to get away from the commercial standards to establish the parameters of their musical identity, and Mardin helped in that regard. 
Mardin liked the American musical influence that Hall & Oates had been brought up on, and knew just how to bring all their ideas to life, adding much of his own vision.

When Hall and Oates began producing their own records in the early 1980s, they thought back to the things they had learned from watching Mardin.

Hall was particularly satisfied with the first side of the album, calling it the "magic" side with every note "just right." The second side was markedly different due to the influence of guitarist Chris Bond, who had ambitions of becoming a producer. “In those days, [Bond] was obsessed with the Beatles," said Hall. "Whenever you hear something that sounds Beatles-esque...you can trace that back to Chris Bond." However, Bond's ideas were not consistent with Hall's ideas of what the album should be. As Hall describes it, he was not yet a Beatles fan when they were making the album, "so side two, if I could change anything, I’d just get rid of all that crap and let the songs be the songs."

Unlike later albums, Abandoned Luncheonette contains a relatively even songwriting split. Both partners contribute a handful of their own songs, while still making room for a few co-writes. Synthesizers were used to obtain the sound the duo wanted on the album.

Critical reception

Initially, the album was not very successful in the U.S., though it received significant airplay on a local Minneapolis–St. Paul FM radio station, KQRS, resulting in its becoming a hit in that area. The album soon became popular on the college circuit.

After "She's Gone" was re-released in 1976 and became a hit, the album peaked at No. 33 on the Billboard 200, but by that time the duo had left Atlantic Records and moved to RCA Records, where they would become one of the biggest acts of the 1980s.

Stephen Thomas Erlewine, from Allmusic, gave the album five stars, calling it "the first indication of the duo's talent for sleek, soul-inflected pop/rock". On December 13, 2002 it was certified platinum by the RIAA.

Notable songs
The most well-known track from the album is "She's Gone". While the song did not become a hit when first released as a single (it peaked at only No. 60 on the U.S Billboard Hot 100), it gained momentum from two later covers, one by Lou Rawls and one by Tavares. After the latter cover topped the Billboard R&B chart in 1974, the original was re-released and became a top 10 pop hit in 1976, reaching No. 7 in the U.S., while the album reached No. 33 on the Billboard Top LPs & Tape chart. It is one of Hall & Oates' favorite songs.

"When the Morning Comes" was the second single released from the album. Record World said of it that the duo is "about to enjoy the first zenith of a long-shining career. Moog majesty and a hook chorus guarantees them a most beautiful 'Morning' hit to come."

Another song from the album, "Las Vegas Turnaround (The Stewardess Song)", although written by Oates, draws its inspiration from Hall's then-girlfriend and future songwriting collaborator Sara Allen, much as the later "Sara Smile" would.

Album cover
The diner on the album cover was formerly the Rosedale Diner, located in Pottstown, Pennsylvania. When it went out of business, its structure was dumped in a small wooded area located along Route 724 in Kenilworth, Pennsylvania, at the entrance of Towpath Park in East Coventry Township, where the photo on the linked page was taken. Stripped by souvenir-hunters, the structure remained in place until about 1983, when Ridge Fire Company, along with the owner, burned what was left to clear the land.

The images were shot by a young fine art photographer named Barbara Wilson. She had originally met Oates in the late 60s while they were both in college, and over the years became friendly with Daryl as well.

On a warm summer day, once the album was finished, Wilson, her husband, Hall and Oates drove from New York city to the rural spot on the road about 40 miles outside of Philadelphia.
The group arranged permission to take photos of the old restaurant but they thought that the session was incomplete without getting inside. And so they snuck in and Wilson started shooting. The interior was used as the back cover. The group left after an altercation with the owner of the property.

Wilson shot the black-and-white 35mm images on an old Nikon SLR and then began a  silkscreen process to create the surreal color imagery, using a different stencil for each hue and then hand-coloring the final piece. Atlantic Records bought the idea with one change, to re-do the neon tubing letters, which had all been done by hand. It was the only album cover Wilson ever did.

She had also spent a day in the Atlantic studios while the album was being recorded and managed to capture a series of intimate images of the two.

Track listing

Personnel 
 Daryl Hall – lead vocals (1, 3, 4, 6-9), backing vocals (all tracks), mandolin (1, 7), electric piano (2-5), acoustic piano (6, 8), keyboards (9)
 John Oates – acoustic guitar (1-3, 5, 7, 9), backing vocals (all but 8), lead vocals (2-5, 7), electric guitar (4, 9)

with

 Chris Bond – Mellotron (1, 4, 9), electric guitar (2, 4, 5, 9), acoustic guitar (3), synthesizer (4, 9), backing vocals (6)
 Pat Rebillot – organ (3)
 Richard Tee – acoustic piano (6)
 Hugh McCracken – electric guitar (1, 7)
 Jerry Ricks – acoustic guitar (2, 5)
 Mark Horowitz – banjo (9)
 Steve Gelfand – bass (1, 2, 4, 7, 9)
 Gordon Edwards – bass (3, 5, 6)
 Bernard Purdie – drums (1, 3-7, 9)
 Rick Marotta – drums (2), percussion (2)
 Ralph MacDonald – percussion (1, 4, 7)
 Pancho Morales – congas (3)
 Joe Farrell –  oboe (1), saxophone (3, 4, 6)
 Marvin Stamm – flugelhorn (8)
 Gloria Agostini – harp (6)
 John Blair – electric violin (7)
 Larry Packer – fiddle (9)

Production 
 Produced by Arif Mardin
 Production Assistant – Christopher Bond
 Recording and Engineering – Alan Ade, Jimmy Douglass, Lewis Hahn, Joel Kerr and Gene Paul.
 Recorded at Atlantic Recording Studios and Advantage Sound Studios (New York, NY).
 Mixing – Christopher Bond and Jimmy Douglass
 Mastered By Stephen Innocenzi at Atlantic Recording Studios.
 Album Design and Photography – B. Wilson
 Coordinator – Tommy Mottola

Charts

References

External links
  Abandoned Luncheonette at discogs.com

1973 albums
Hall & Oates albums
Atlantic Records albums
Albums produced by Arif Mardin
Folk rock albums by American artists